Tornike Tsjakadoea (born 5 October 1996) is a Dutch judoka. He represented the Netherlands at the 2020 Summer Olympics in Tokyo, Japan. He competed at the World Judo Championships in 2018, 2019 and 2021.

In 2020, he won one of the bronze medals in the men's 60 kg event at the Judo Grand Slam Düsseldorf held in Düsseldorf, Germany. In the same year, he competed in the men's 60 kg event at the 2020 European Judo Championships held in Prague, Czech Republic.

In 2021, he won one of the bronze medals in his event at the Judo World Masters held in Doha, Qatar.

He represented the Netherlands at the 2020 Summer Olympics in Tokyo, Japan. He lost his bronze medal match in the men's 60 kg event.

He lost his bronze medal match at the 2022 Judo Grand Slam Tel Aviv held in Tel Aviv, Israel.

References

External links
 
 
 

Living people
1996 births
Sportspeople from Leeuwarden
Dutch male judoka
Judoka at the 2019 European Games
European Games competitors for the Netherlands
Judoka at the 2020 Summer Olympics
Olympic judoka of the Netherlands
21st-century Dutch people